The Finance Commissions (IAST: Vitta Āyoga) are commissions periodically constituted by the President of India under Article 280 of the Indian Constitution to define the financial relations between the central government of India and the individual state governments. The First Commission was established in 1951 under The Finance Commission (Miscellaneous Provisions) Act, 1951. Fifteen Finance Commissions have been constituted since the promulgation of Indian Constitution in 1950. Individual commissions operate under the terms of reference which are different for every commission, and they define the terms of qualification, appointment and disqualification, the term, eligibility and powers of the Finance Commission. As per the constitution, the commission is appointed every five years and consists of a chairman and four other members.

The most recent Finance Commission was constituted in 2017 and is chaired by N. K.Singh, a former member of the Planning Commission.

History
As a federal nation, India suffers from both vertical and horizontal fiscal imbalances. Vertical imbalances between the central and state governments result from states incurring expenditures disproportionate to their sources of revenue, in the process of fulfilling their responsibilities. However, states are better able to gauge the needs and concerns of their inhabitants and therefore more efficient at addressing them. Horizontal imbalances among state governments result from differing historical backgrounds or resource endowments, and can widen over time.

The Finance Commission was established in 1951 by Dr. B.R. Ambedkar, the then-incumbent law minister, to address these imbalances. Several provisions to bridge the fiscal gap between the center and the states were already enshrined in the Constitution of India, including Article 268, which facilitates levy of duties by the center but equips the States to collect and retain the same. Similarly, Articles 269, 270, 275, 282 and 293, among others, specify ways and means of sharing resources between the Union and States. In addition to the above provisions, the finance commission serves as an institutional framework to facilitate Centre-State Transfers.

Article 280 of the Indian Constitution defines the scope of the commission:

 The President will constitute a finance commission within two years from the commencement of the Constitution and thereafter at the end of every fifth year or earlier, as the deemed necessary by him/her, which shall include a chairman and four other members.
 Parliament may by law determine the requisite qualifications for appointment as members of the commission and the procedure of selection.
 The commission is constituted to make recommendations to the president about the distribution of the net proceeds of taxes between the Union and States and also the allocation of the same among the States themselves. It is also under the ambit of the finance commission to define the financial relations between the Union and the States. They also deal with the devolution of unplanned revenue resources.

Functions
 Distribution of 'net proceeds' of taxes between Center and the States, to be divided as per their respective contributions to the taxes.
 Determine factors governing Grants-in-Aid to the states and the magnitude of the same.
 To make recommendations to the president as to the measures needed to augment the Fund of a State to supplement the resources of the panchayats and municipalities in the state on the basis of the recommendations made by the finance commission of the state.
 Any other matter related to it by the president in the interest of sound finance.

The Finance Commission (Miscellaneous Provisions) Act, 1951

The Finance Commission (Miscellaneous Provisions) Act, 1951 was passed to give a structured format to the finance commission and to bring it to par with world standards, by laying down rules for the qualification and disqualification of members of the commission, and for their appointment, term, eligibility and powers.

Qualifications of the members 
The chairman of a finance commission is selected from people with experience of public affairs. The other four members are selected from people who:

 Are, or have been, or are qualified, as judges of a high court,
 Have knowledge of government finances or accounts, or
 Have had experience in administration and financial expertise; or
 Have special knowledge of economics

Disqualification from being a member of the commission 
A member may be disqualified if:
 He is mentally unsound; and as follows-
 He is an undischarged insolvent;
 He has been convicted of an immoral offence;
 His financial and other interests are such that it hinders the smooth functioning of the commission.

Terms of office of members and eligibility for reappointment 
Every member will be in office for the time period as specified in the order of the President, but is eligible for reappointment provided he has, by means of a letter addressed to the president, resigned his office.

Salaries and allowances of the members 
The members of the commission shall provide full-time or part-time service to the commission, as the President specifies in his order. The members shall be paid salaries and allowances as per the provisions made by the Central Government.

List of Finance Commissions 
So far 15 Finance Commissions have been appointed which are as follows:

14th Finance Commission 

Major Recommendations of 14th Finance Commission headed by Prof. Y V Reddy

 The share of states in the net proceeds of the shareable Central taxes should be 42%. This is 10 percentage points higher than the recommendation of 13th Finance Commission.
 Revenue deficit to be progressively reduced and eliminated.
 Fiscal deficit to be reduced to 3% of the GDP by 2017–18.
 A target of 62% of GDP for the combined debt of centre and states.
 The Medium Term Fiscal Plan (MTFP) should be reformed and made the statement of commitment rather than a statement of intent.
 FRBM Act needs to be amended to mention the nature of shocks which shall require targets relaxation.
 Both centre and states should conclude 'Grand Bargain' to implement the model Goods and Services Act (GST).
 Initiatives to reduce the number of Central Sponsored Schemes (CSS) and to restore the predominance of formula-based plan grants.
 States need to address the problem of losses in the power sector in time bound manner.

15th Finance Commission 

The Fifteenth Finance Commission was constituted by the Government of India, after the approval from the President of India, through a notification in the Gazette of India in November 2017. Nand Kishore Singh was appointed as the commission's chairman, with its full-time members being Shaktikanta Das and Anoop Singh and its part-time members being Ramesh Chand and Ashok Lahiri. However Ajay Narayan Jha was appointed replacing Shaktikanta Das who resigned from the commission to serve as the governor of the Reserve Bank of India.

The commission was set up to give recommendations for five years commencing on 1 April 2020. The main tasks of the commission were to "strengthen cooperative federalism, improve the quality of public spending and help protect fiscal stability". Some newspapers like The Hindu and The Economic Times noted that commission's job was harder because of the rollout of goods and service tax (GST), as, it had taken certain powers related to taxation away from states and the Union and had given it to the GST Council.

See also
 Part One of the Constitution of India
 Fiscal Responsibility and Budget Management Act, 2003

References

External links
 Full text of the Constitution of India (as of July 2008)
 Homepage of the Finance Commission

Indian commissions and inquiries
Government finances in India
Finance in India
Finance Commission of India